The canton of Arize-Lèze is an administrative division of the Ariège department, southern France. It was created at the French canton reorganisation which came into effect in March 2015. Its seat is in Lézat-sur-Lèze.

It consists of the following communes:
 
Artigat
La Bastide-de-Besplas
Les Bordes-sur-Arize
Camarade
Campagne-sur-Arize
Carla-Bayle
Castéras
Castex
Daumazan-sur-Arize
Durfort
Fornex
Le Fossat
Gabre
Lanoux
Lézat-sur-Lèze
Loubaut
Le Mas-d'Azil
Méras
Monesple
Montfa
Pailhès
Sabarat
Sainte-Suzanne
Saint-Ybars
Sieuras
Thouars-sur-Arize
Villeneuve-du-Latou

References

Cantons of Ariège (department)